Pool's Cove is a community located on the north west side of Fortune Bay, on the South Coast of Newfoundland, Canada. The town had a population of 143 in the 2021 Census.

The ferry MV Terra Nova has a port in Pool's Cove servicing the isolated outport Rencontre East with another port in Bay L'Argent, on the Burin Peninsula.

Traditionally a fishing community, aquaculture is an important economic driver in the region.

Pool's Cove has road access via the  Pool's Cove Road, connecting the town with Route 362.

Demographics 

References

Towns in Newfoundland and Labrador
Fishing communities in Canada